The Bistra is a right tributary of the river Vișeu in Romania. It discharges into the Vișeu in the village Bistra.

References

Rivers of Romania
Rivers of Maramureș County